The Blue Djinn of Babylon is a novel by P. B. Kerr which tells the second chapter of John and Philippa Gaunt and their adventures as djinn.  It is the second book of the Children of the Lamp series.  The book earned a place on the New York Times Best Seller list for children's books and received generally favorable reviews.

Plot summary
In the year 2005, at the end of October, at Halloween, Phillipa wanted to be a witch and John wanted to be a Dracula with real blood. They lived at 77 East 77th Street in New York.

After having promised their mother, Layla, not to use their djinn powers without consulting her first, John and Philippa are leading pretty normal lives.  When Phillipa enters the Djinnverso tournament (also called Djinnversoctoannular, a djinn game of bluffing with 7 astaralgi, or 8 sided dice, the object being to undermine luck) unbidden events are set into motion and she is framed as a cheater.  The twins also learn that the famed book, Solomon's Grimoire, which is in the care of Ayesha, the Blue Djinn of Babylon and the ruler of all six tribes of djinn, has been stolen.  The Grimoire gives anyone who uses its spells vast control over a djinn.  The twins go in search of the missing book, leading them into more danger and adventures.

It turns out that Solomon's Grimoire is not missing, but instead was being used as a trap for Philippa.  Ayesha, the twins' grandmother (whom they do not know of until the end of the book), wished to kidnap Philippa so that she would be the next Blue Djinn, as Ayesha's life was rapidly expiring. Jockeying for her position was Mimi de Ghulle, a wicked djinn from the tribe of Ghul; however, she is having little success. John goes in search of Philippa, who is being held at the Blue Djinn's secret palace in Babylon. The twin's favorite uncle, Nimrod, also goes in search of an acceptable alternative to Philippa as the next Blue Djinn.  The book alternates between John's search for Philippa, told in third person narration, and Philippa's experiences, told in first person in the form of a diary.  Philippa discovers that the Blue Djinn's powers to be beyond good and evil come from the Garden of Eden's Tree of Logic.  Slowly Philippa loses her humanity as the Tree has greater and greater effects on her.  John, in his search, faces numerous obstacles in finding and reaching the palace. He is aided by two of his uncles, Alan and Neil, who were turned into dogs by his mother for attempting the murder of their brother, John and Philippa's father, Edward, for his fortune. In addition, John attains a copy of The Bellili Scrolls, a map to the palace, and of its underground locale, Iravotum. The book climaxes when John reaches the palace and manages to rescue Philippa. However, during their traversal of Iravotum, Alan and Neil attack a large bird, called the Rukkh, that was attacking the group, biting its legs. However, the dogs did not let go, and fell to the ground, killing them. It is later revealed that Layla's binding of the human Alan and Neil would last only as long as the physical bodies of the dogs they inhabit, leaving the human Alan and Neil alive.

The twins join Nimrod and Groanin in a restaurant, called Kebabylon, in Iraq, near Iravotum. A reporter introduced earlier in the book is also present. The reporter, Montana Retch, is actually a djinn tracker hired by Mimi de Ghulle to eliminate Philippa, so that Mimi would be the only candidate for the post of Blue Djinn. After Layla appears, having been summoned by the transformation of Alan and Neil, she transforms Montana Retch into a cat, reversing her previous vow never to use djinn power again.

It is revealed to the reader, but not John and Philippa, that Ayesha did not wish Philippa to be the next Blue Djinn; she wanted Layla. However, Layla had refused, prompting Ayesha to kidnap Philippa to use as a bargaining tool.  As Ayesha knew she would, Layla offered herself to become the next Blue Djinn in place of Philippa; Nimrod is also privy to this due to his own conclusions. The novel ends with the children still not knowing, but as Layla knows Ayesha's life is rapidly ending, must tell her children the reason Ayesha did not pursue them after escaping and leave forever to assume her post as the cold-hearted Blue Djinn of Babylon.

Major characters
 The major characters in this mystery are Nimrod, Groanin, John, Phillipa, Layla, and Ayesha.

References

2005 novels
2005 fantasy novels
Children's fantasy novels
Sequel novels
Children of the Lamp